Qazi Syed Inayatullah (died circa 1125 AH / 1713 AD) was a scholar of Fiqh from Sakras, District Mewat (Haryana). He belonged to the family of Gardēzī Sadaat.

Biography
Qazi Syed Inayatullah was a scholar of Fiqh, an expert in sharia laws, from Sakras, Ferozepur Jhirka, District Mewat (earlier Gurgaon), Haryana. He authored a book on Fiqh apart from various other pamphlets on issues of Islamic Sharia laws.

His personality was so profound that his name was remembered as "Profound man" in any ceremonial occasions by every Mirasi while reading family tree of Sadaat-i Sakras. During the riots of 1947, where other important assets were lost, the family tree of Sadaat-i Sakras was also lost. The family Mirasi of Qazi Syed Inayatullah died in Pakistan, who knew the names of all his descendants till Ali. The only available family tree of 'Sadaat-i Sakras' owed the genealogy of Alvi family (descendant of Shah Maroof Ghazi – the uncle of Ghazi Saiyyad Salar Masud). Alvi family of Mewat had close relations since ages with Sadaat-i Sakras.

His copies of many judgments as Islamic lawyer were preserved in the Library of Hakim Syed Karam Husain at Tijara, Alwar.

Family
His ancestors Syed Shamsuddin Sani (alias Syed Chajju Jagat Jaut ibn Mir Imaduddin ibn Syed Shamsuddin) came to India during the reign of Sultan Shams-ud-din Iltutmish (1211–1235).

Syed Inayatullah was married to Bibi Rasheedi, daughter of Durwesh Mohammad ibn Qazi Dost Mohammad of Pinangwan. One son, Qazi Syed Hayatullah and one daughter Bibi Ruqaiya was born. Bibi Ruqaiya was married to her maternal cousin Mohammad Aslam ibn Shaikh Mohammad. This family produced many noblemen in the kingdom of Mughals.

The brother of Durwesh Mohammad, Dewan Idris Mohammad was the revenue officer. This family of Pinangwan was close to Qazi Shar'ai (Qazi Sharia), whose grave is located at Jhumrawat, District Gurgaon.

The other daughter of Durwesh Mohammad, Hafizi, was the second wife of Shaikh Mohammad of Khilora. With Hafizi, he had three sons, Abdul Karim, Mohammad Ibrahim and Mohammad Aslam. Shaikh Mohammad was earlier married to Raj Bibi, daughter of Qazi Ibrahim of Tijara. Qazi Ibrahim was the son of Qazi Mahmood. The son of Qazi Ibrahim, Qazi Abdul Baqi was married to Bibi Rabiya, daughter of Qazi Dost Mohammad and the sister of Dewan Idris Mohammad. 
 Hākim-e Shariah Shareef Qazi-e Aazam ibn Qazi Ziauddin of Pinangwan was 'Qazi Qadaa' (authority to appoint Qazi). Akbar on 4 Jumada al-Thani 976 AH / 1568 awarded him 2000 Bigha Arazi Swad at Tijara. Qazi Mahmood (died 1005 AH / 1596 AD) was the son of Hākim-e Shariah Shareef Qazi-e Aazam. His brother Mohammad Hashim, his son Abdul Hafeez and grandson Ghulam Naqsh Band had also received many Firman (decree) like Qazi Mahmood. Qazi Ibrahim son of Qazi Mahmood was also 'Qazi Qadaa' at Tijara. Shahjahan awarded him Firman (decree) first on 22 Dhu al-Hijjah 1054 AH (Juloos 18) and second on 19 Ramadan 1055 AH. Some parts of his ruined haveli is still seen at Tijara. He died on 5 Moharram 1074 AH / 1665 AD. Qazi Abdul Baqi son of Qazi Ibrahim had also close relations with the Durbar of Aurangzeb and had given him charge of appointing 'Qazi' at Tijara. As per the Firman (decree) of Aurangzeb sealed by 'Sadr Sadoor Abid Khan', he was awarded Sanad of Qadaa. He also built various orchards and Havelis like Haveli Kalan, Deewan Khana, Kothi Bagh etc at Tijara. He had business of horses from Arabian breed. The main gates at the Qazi Mohallah were built by him. In the archive of Tahsil Tijara, dated 1070 AH shows the 'Mafi Bagh' in the name of Qazi Abdul Baqi.

Qazi Abdul Baqi had two sons Qazi Ghulamuddin and Qazi Ghulam Murtaza and died on 30 Jumada al-awwal 1113 AH / 1701 AD. The elder daughter of Qazi Abdul Baqi was married to Abu Saeed bin Abdul Ghaffar of Sakras, while the younger daughter Khwanda Daulat Bint was married to Syed Chajju of Mohina. Syed Chajju had four daughters and four sons Syed Zainuddin, Syed Tajuddin, Syed Imamuddin and Syed Shamsuddin. Syed Zainuddin was married to Ummatullah daughter of Qazi Ghulam Murtaza of Tijara. Syed Tajuddin was married to Halima, daughter of Abdul Hadi ibn Qazi Ibrahim. One daughter of Syed Chajju was married to Syed Abdul Wajid Risaldar of Syed Sarai, Rewari. Syed Mohammad Ashraf Risaldar was his son. Syed Mohammad Ashraf had two sons Syed Yusuf Ali Khan and Syed Saeed Ali Khan. Syed Yusuf Ali Khan had one son Syed Hasan Askari Khan while Syed Saeed Ali Khan had two sons Syed Ahmad Hussain Khan and Syed Qasim Hussain Khan.

Syed Yusuf Ali Khan's one Diwan (poetry) in Urdu is extant in the library of Raza Library, Rampur and another Diwan (poetry) in Hindi vernacular is extant in the Khuda Bakhsh Oriental Library, Patna. In the book, 'Tarikh-i Mohammadi ‘ his name is mentioned as one of the important Emirs during the reign of Mohammad Azam Shah. Syed Yusuf Ali Khan was first married to Sharfun Nisan daughter of Ghulam Hussain (brother of Kartalab Khan Qazi Ghulam Mustafa) and had one daughter (married to Syed Mohammad Jalal). With second wife, Syed Hasan Askari Khan was born.

Noorullah was the son of Qazi Ghulam Murtaza, and married to Kafia, sister of Mirza Salar Beg ibn Allah Dost Beg (brother Diwan Idris Mohammad).

The brother of Qazi Abdul Baqi Abdul Hadi was employed in army.

Bibi Ruqaiya had two sons Mohammad Akram and Mohammad Mukram. Mohammad Akram was married to the daughter of Qazi Badruddin ibn Qazi Ghulam Mohiuddin.  Qazi Ghulam Mohiuddin like his father Qazi Abdul Baqi got the Firman (decree) sealed by 'Sadr Sadoor Rizvi Khan', he was awarded Sanad of Qadaa. He had two sons Qazi Badruddin and Ghulam Mahmood.

Qazi Badruddin had two sons – Qazi Mohammad Mah and Mohammad Sultan Khan. Qazi Mohammad Mah was first attached to the rule of Nawab Amir Khan Bahadur and then in the court of Nawab Bahadur aka Jawed Khan at some higher post. Lastly, he was appointed again at some higher post at Rewari by Raja Nagar Mal 'Ummadul Mulk'. Rewari at that time was jagir of Raja Nagar Mal. When Sikhs attacked Rewari and captured the whole area, he with Shaikh Yar Mohammad Khan (Sardar of Maharaja) and elder son Qazi Mohammad Aman, died during fighting inside the Haveli of Rao Gujar Mal on 22 Rajab 1179 AH / 1765 AD.
 In this same fight with Sikhs, Qazi Ali Mardan ibn Qazi Ghulam Naqshband of Rewari was also died in his Haveli. The whole city was ravaged. Arrangement to bury the dead bodies could not be made. The young son of Qazi Mohammad Mah, Mohammad Ata was detained with other family members inside the fort of Gogulgarh and could not come out. By chance, from the same route, Mohammad Saleh ibn Mohammad Sultan Khan, was returning from Ziyarat Khwaja Buzurg Ajmeri of Quds Sarah and informed about the incident in Tijara. The relatives from Tijara went to Rewari secretly and brought the dead bodies of Qazi Mohammad Mah and his son Qazi Mohammad Aman (also entitled 'Khan'). They were then buried after seven days on 28 Rajab near Takya Shah Abdul Majeed at the big Bagh.

Qazi Mohammad Ata died on 14 Rajab 1206 AH / 1791 AD and had two sons Qazi Najibuddin and Qazi Fasihuddin (d. 7 Jumada al-awwal 1242 AH / 1826). Both first worked in Nagpur and then Ajmer.

Mohammad Sultan (son of Qazi Badruddin) was Mansabdar (3,000) and entitled with 'Khan' by Mughal emperor Muhammad Shah. He was first attached to the court of Baluch and then joined the services at Nawab Bahadur aka Jawed Khan. After the death of Nawab Bahadur, he joined as 'Mansab Buland' in the court of Raja Nagar Mal 'Ummadul Mulk'. He also built a Haveli at Mohalla Qazi Wada, Tijara. He was married to Bibi Mohtarma (d. 10 Rabi' al-awwal 1204 AH / 1789 AD; daughter of Mufti Mohammad Raza of Rewari) and had one daughter Jamiatun Nisan and three sons – Mohammad Saleh, Hafiz Abul Barkat and Mohammd Saeed. These three brothers had big Risala (Risaldar).

See also 
Qazi Syed Rafi Mohammad
Qazi Syed Mohammad Zaman
Qazi Syed Mohammad Rafi
Ghulam Mansoor
Syed Ziaur Rahman

References 

1713 deaths
18th-century Indian people
People from Mewat
Hanafis
Indian Sunni Muslim scholars of Islam
People from Ferozepur Jhirka
Gardēzī Sadaat
Muslim scholars of Islamic jurisprudence
Islamic jurisprudence
Year of birth unknown